Wacław Bojarski, pseudonym "Czarnota" (30 October 1921 – 5 June 1943) was a Polish poet belonging to the Generation of Columbuses and the Konfederacja Narodu underground organizations. During the Second World War he studied in the Warsaw underground university. He was the editor in chief of the monthly magazine Sztuka i Naród (Art and Nation). 

Bojarski died on 5 June 1943 whilst suffering from wounds from the day's earlier fight with German forces.

References

1921 births
1943 deaths
Polish resistance members of World War II
20th-century Polish poets
Resistance members killed by Nazi Germany